State Road 25 (SR 25) is a state highway in the U.S. state of Florida.
It is mainly signed as U.S. Highways:
U.S. Highway 27 from Hialeah to Lady Lake and Belleview to Ocala
U.S. Highway 301 from Belleview to near Sparr
U.S. Highway 441 from Belleview to Lake City
U.S. Highway 41 from High Springs to the Georgia state line near Jennings, connecting with Georgia State Route 7

The portion from Lady Lake to Belleview is now County Road 25. A short piece in Belleview, from State Road 35 to U.S. Highway 27/301/441 (SR 500), is signed as SR 25.

Major intersections

Related routes

State Road 25A

State Road 25A is an unsigned designation for part of U.S. Route 441 along Marion Street in Lake City, Florida. It runs from State Road 25 south of downtown, where U.S. Routes 41 and 441 break away from each other and run parallel to each other. North of US 90, State Road 47 joins the route downtown and follows SR 25A in a hidden concurrency. North of County Road 100A, SR 25A splits from US 441 at the intersection of County Road 250 and branches off to the northwest onto North Valdosta Road where it becomes County Road 25A. The road runs in a straight northwest to southeast trajectory until it curves to the southwest and  terminates at US 41/SR 25/SR 100 just south of the interchange with I-10.

County Road 25A (Lake County)

County Road 25A is a pair of county suffixed alternate of SR 25. The first segment is entirely in Leesburg along the eastern shores of  Lake Denham on the west side of  U.S. Route 27 and Singletary Park beginning one mile north of the northern terminus of CR 33, and ending 0.7 miles south of the intersection with State Road 44.

The second section also begins at US 27 in Leesburg, but here it also has the concurrency with  U.S. Route 441. Like the one further south, it runs along the west side of the parent route but this segment enters Fruitland  Park. The northern terminus is at US 27-441 in Fruitland Park just south of the intersection with Cook Street and Register Road.

County Road 25A (Belleview)

County Road 25A in Belleview, Florida is the first of two county suffixed alternate of SR 25. The road runs east and west between  US 27/441 (SR 500) and County Road 25 in Belleview, just before SR/CR 25 reunites with US 27/441, as well as an additional overlap with  US 301.

County Road 25A (Ocala-Reddick)

The second County Road 25A is another county suffixed alternate of SR 25, that was once part of US 441 and then ALT US 441.

County Road 25A (Micanopy)

County Road 25A is actually one of two county suffixed alternates of State Road 25 in Alachua County. The first begins at US 441/SR 25 branching off of that road just to the northwest onto Southeast Tuscawilla Road. After it enters the Micanopy town limits it becomes Northeast Fist Street then turns west onto Northwest Seminary Road, which is a former segment of State Highway 329, that terminates at CR 234 when it leaves the town. CR 25A turns north onto a concurrency with CR 234 which runs turns south towards I-75 at Exit 234. CRs 25A/234 enters a portion of Paynes Prairie State Preserve where it terminates with US 441/SR 25, as CR 234 briefly turns east to join southbound US 441 until it reaches Northeast First Street.

County Road 25A (Alachua)

The second County Road 25A is located in eastern Alachua and northwestern Gainesville. Though geologically it runs east and west, it is technically a north and south road. It begins at US 441 (SR 25) where that route runs between the borders of both cities, and runs along a railroad line. Eventually it enters Alachua entirely passing south of a University of Florida Dairy Research Unit. It has intersections with Northwest 126th Lane and CR 237 before terminating back with US 441/SR 25.

County Road 25B

County Road 25B includes Northwest 174th Avenue, Southeast 17th Street and Northwest 222nd Street in High Springs. It begins as Northwest 174th Avenue at US 27/41, which runs east and west until it reaches Southeast 17th Street, where it turns north. Just before the intersection with a dirt road named Northwest 179th Place it curves to the northeast and becomes Northwest 222nd Street which then intersects Railroad Avenue, and the railroad line for which it is named, then finally intersects with its parent route, hidden SR 25 (US 441), which is also in a concurrency with State Road 20.

County Road 25A (Hamilton County)

County Road 25A is the northernmost county suffixed alternate of SR 25 in the state, but that route does not reunite with its parent road. It runs west from US 41 in White Springs as Camp Street then turns north onto Jackson Street only to make another left turn onto Osceola Road. From here it runs northwest along the north side of the Suwannee River running in front of two parklands, the first being the Stephen Foster Folk Culture Center State Park, and the next being the Swift Creek Conservation Area. The road eventually runs over a bridge over Interstate 75 with no access and curves right to run parallel to I-75 until it reaches the outskirts of the FDOT Truck inspection stations. After passing by the southbound inspection station, it takes another sharp turn to the west and the one last turn to the northwest, where it finally terminates at CR 132 in the unincorporated community of Marion.

References

External links
Florida Route Log (SR 25)
Florida Route Log (SR 25A)

State highways in Florida
State Roads in Miami-Dade County, Florida
State Roads in Miami
State Roads in Broward County, Florida
State Roads in Palm Beach County, Florida
State Roads in Hendry County, Florida
State Roads in Glades County, Florida
State Roads in Highlands County, Florida
State Roads in Polk County, Florida
State Roads in Lake County, Florida
State Roads in Sumter County, Florida
State Roads in Marion County, Florida
State Roads in Alachua County, Florida
State Roads in Gainesville, Florida
State Roads in Columbia County, Florida
State Roads in Hamilton County, Florida
County roads in Lake County, Florida
County roads in Marion County, Florida
U.S. Route 27
U.S. Route 41
U.S. Route 301
U.S. Route 441
1945 establishments in Florida